Persicaria decipiens, commonly known as slender knotweed, is a species of flowering plant native to Australia and Asia.

The slender pink flower spikes appear from November to June, with a peak in February. Cylindrical in shape, they are not stiff and tend to bend over. The plant tends to die back in winter and regenerate after water.

Persicaria decipiens was among the plants collected by Joseph Banks and Daniel Solander on 5 May 1770 at Botany Bay during the first voyage of Captain James Cook. Prolific Scottish botanist Robert Brown described the species as Polygonum decipiens in his 1810 work Prodromus Florae Novae Hollandiae et Insulae Van Diemen. It was given its current name by Karen Wilson in 1988 as the broadly defined genus Polygonum was split into smaller genera. Common names include slender knotweed, willow weed and snake root.

P. decipiens is found in water and wet soil. It is found across Africa and the Mediterranean, through southwestern Asia, Malesia and all states of Australia, as well as Norfolk Island, New Zealand and New Caledonia. It has become naturalised in Madagascar.

Likely pollinators of its flowers are insects, including honeybees, native bees, flies, wasps and small butterflies.

Persicaria decipiens is not cultivated but is eaten locally in times of famine in Africa.

References

External links 

 Persicaria decipiens occurrence data from GBIF

Flora of New South Wales
Perennial plants
decipiens
Plants described in 1810
Taxa named by Robert Brown (botanist, born 1773)